The Northgate Ward is a Brisbane City Council ward covering Northgate, Banyo, Nudgee, Nudgee Beach, Nundah, Virginia, Wavell Heights, and parts of Chermside and Kedron.

Councillors for Northgate Ward

Results

References 

City of Brisbane wards